Csávoly (Croatian: Čavolj, Serbian Cyrillic: Чавољ) is a village in Bács-Kiskun county, Hungary. It is about  far away from Baja.

History

Csávoly's history can be traced back to 1198. The village - under the name of Chayol-Thayal - had many proprietors since 1374. According to Turkish tax listings, Csávoly had 22 houses in 1580. After this time, the village was destroyed and founded again several times. The town was reborn in 1734. The first church was constructed in 1740. Between 1782 and 1784, on the suggestion of the bishop of Kalocsa, 424 Germans settled the village from Soroksár and Hajós.

1947 was a major turning point in the village's history. According to the Potsdam Decree, 553 Germans were replaced with Hungarians from Slovakia (the Germans were deported to Germany).

Demographics

Csávoly still remains a multiethnic village (with a Hungarian majority). Existing minorities include:
  German
  Bunjevci

Csávoly has 2,104 residents.

Buildings and structures 
 165 metres tall guyed mast used for FM-/TV-broadcasting

External links
 Csávoly's entire history in Hungarian
 Csávoly Public Library
 Map of Csávoly

Populated places in Bács-Kiskun County
Places in Bačka
Hungarian German communities